Sweden was represented by Inger Berggren, singing "Sol och vår", in the Eurovision Song Contest 1962. Berggren was selected by a national final called Eurovisionsschlagern, svensk final. Another singer, Lily Berglund, also sung the song there. The song was written and composed by Ulf Källkvist and Åke Gerhard.

At the Eurovision Song Contest, held in Luxembourg, Berggren came 7th out of 16.

Melodifestivalen 1962 
Melodifestivalen 1962 (known as Eurovisionsschlagern, svensk final) was the selection for the fifth song to represent Sweden at the Eurovision Song Contest. It was the fourth time that this system of picking a song had been used. One singer performed the song with a large orchestra and one with a smaller orchestra. Seven songs were submitted to SVT for the competition, of which one was disqualified. The final was held in the Cirkus in Stockholm on 13 February 1962, broadcast on Sveriges Radio TV but was not broadcast on radio. The winner was decided by postcard voting.

 1: Performer with large orchestra
 2: Performer with smaller orchestra

At Eurovision

Voting

References

External links
ESCSweden.com (in Swedish)
Information site about Melodifestivalen
Eurovision Song Contest National Finals

1962
Countries in the Eurovision Song Contest 1962
1962
Eurovision
Eurovision

es:Melodifestivalen 1962
sv:Melodifestivalen 1962